The men's points race at the 2006 Dutch National Track Championships in Alkmaar took place at Sportpaleis Alkmaar on December 28, 2006. 22 athletes participated in the contest.

Pim Ligthart won the points race with 2 points ahead of Arno van der Zwet and 4 points ahead of Sander Lormans.

Final results (top 12)

References

2006 Dutch National track cycling championships
Dutch National Track Championships – Men's points race